The following is a list of awards and nominations received by American actress Kerry Washington.

BET Awards

Black Reel Awards

Golden Globe Awards

Grio Awards

Independent Spirit Awards

MTV Movie Awards

NAACP Image Awards

Primetime Emmy Awards

Satellite Awards

Screen Actors Guild Awards

Teen Choice Awards

Miscellaneous

References

Washington, Kerry